Edward F. Aboufadel is an American mathematician currently Professor at Grand Valley State University and an Elected Fellow of the American Association for the Advancement of Science.

Education
He earned his B.S at Michigan State University in 1986 and his PhD at Rutgers University in 1992 under the supervision of Jane Cronin Scanlon.

Research
His interests are wavelets and data sets and 3D printing. His highest cited paper is "Discovering wavelets"

Publications
Edward Aboufadel, David Austin. A new method for computing the mean center of population of the United States. 58:1. 65–69. The Professional Geographer. 2006.
Merle C Potter, Jack Leonard Goldberg, Edward Aboufadel. Advanced engineering mathematics. Oxford University Press. 2005.
C Beckmann, P Wells, J Gabrosek, E Billings, E Aboufadel, P Curtiss, W Dickson, D Austin, A Champion. Enhancing the mathematical understanding of prospective teachers: Using Standards-based, grades K–12 activities. 151–163. Perspectives on the teaching of mathematics. 2004.

References

Year of birth missing (living people)
Living people
Fellows of the American Association for the Advancement of Science
Grand Valley State University faculty
20th-century American mathematicians
Michigan State University alumni
Rutgers University alumni
21st-century American mathematicians